Astrachi is the name of several rural localities in Bolshedvorskoye Settlement Municipal Formation of Boksitogorsky District of Leningrad Oblast, Russia:
Astrachi (settlement of the crossing), a settlement of the crossing
Astrachi (village), a village